Ga'aton is a kibbutz in northern Israel. Located in the western Galilee, it falls under the jurisdiction of Mateh Asher Regional Council.

Etymology
The name Ga'aton is taken from the Ga'aton River that passes nearby and flows through Nahariya into the Mediterranean Sea.

Ga'aton, in the past transliterated as Gaathon, is also the name of a biblical town in the allotment of Asher, located at one of the ancient tells (mounds) near the kibbutz. The tell known as Horbat Ga'aton ("ruins of Ga'aton"; from Arabic Khirbat Ja'tun) northwest of the kibbutz and near the Ga'aton River is one candidate, and there are other tells in the vicinity with remains from the time of the Hebrew Bible. Most English translations of the Hebrew Bible offer the name Gaash; in the Latin of the Vulgate it is Gaas.

History

Ceramic remains found in Ga'aton were dated to the Byzantine era, 5th to 7th century CE.

In the Crusader period, Ga'aton (named Iazon)  was  mentioned in 1160, when it and several other villages in the area of Castellum Regis was transferred to a Crusader named Iohanni de Caypha (Johannes of Haifa).  In 1182 Jazun was especially excluded from the list of estates belonging to  Jocelyn III in the area.

In 1220, when  Jocelyn III's daughter Beatrix de Courtenay and her husband Otto von Botenlauben sold Mi'ilya and its  dependencies to the Teutonic Knights,  Ga'aton (called Ihazon, Jaharon, Jaroth) was again explicitly excluded from the sale.

In documents dating to 1253 (Jasson) and 1256, (Jashon) it was included in the area of Casal Imbert.

In 1283 Ga'aton was still part of the Crusader states, as it was mentioned as part of their domain in the hudna between the Crusaders based in Acre and the Mamluk sultan  Qalawun.

Ottoman period
The population was 11 households, all Muslim. They paid a fixed tax-rate of 25% on agricultural products, including wheat, barley, fruit trees, cotton, goats and beehives; in addition to grasslands, occasional revenues and a water mill, a total of 3000 Akçe.

In 1875, Victor Guérin found the village to have 15 farmers and shepherds, however, in  1881, the PEF's Survey of Western Palestine (SWP)  found at Khurbet Jathun only heaps of stones and modern ruins, a few mills, and some well-dressed stones scattered about.

British Mandate period
The  1922 census of Palestine listed under "Ja'atun" a population of 19 Muslims. 

Part of the area was acquired by the Jewish community as part of the Sursock Purchase. In the 1945 statistics the population of Ga'aton was 140, all Jews; the area was counted together with that of Shavei Tzion, Mazra'a and Ein Sara, and totalled 7,407 dunams of land according to an official land and population survey.

Kibbutz Ga'aton was founded by members of the "May 1st" gar'in of immigrants from Hungary. The group, which was affiliated with the left-wing Hashomer Hatzair movement and took its name from the International Workers' Day, did its pioneering training at Kibbutz Eilon on the Lebanese border, and on 8 October 1948, founded its own kibbutz, which was at first named "May 1st" and later renamed "Ga'aton".

According to Palestinian historian Walid Khalidi, the kibbutz was established on land belonging to Khirbat Jiddin, the Arabic name of a ruined castle used by the al-Suwaytat Bedouin tribe and listed by Khalidi as a depopulated Palestinian village.

Dance company
Kibbutz Ga'aton is the home of the Kibbutz Contemporary Dance Company (KCDC). The company's dance groups participate in some 200 performances a year in Israel and overseas.

Economy
One of the kibbutz industries is Yamaton Ltd., a joint venture with Kibbutz Ein Hamifratz. The company produces honeycomb paper products.

Notable people
Yael Ron Ben-Moshe (born 1978), member of the Knesset for Blue and White
Shmuel Katz (1926–2010), artist, illustrator and cartoonist

See also
Sursock family

References

Bibliography

External links
Survey of Western Palestine, Map 3:  IAA, Wikimedia commons 

Kibbutzim
Kibbutz Movement
Populated places in Northern District (Israel)
1948 establishments in Israel